Montes is a village in the east of Canelones Department of southern Uruguay.

Montes is also the name of the municipality to which the town belongs.

Geography

Location
The border with Lavalleja Department is the stream Arroyo Solís Grande, which flows by the east limits of the town.

History
Montes was founded in November 1891. Its status was elevated to "Pueblo" (village) on 3 November 1952 by the Act of Ley Nº 11.878.

Population
According to the 2011 census, Montes had a population of 1,760. In 2010, the Intendencia de Canelones had estimated a population of 1,968 for the municipality during the elections.

 
Source: Instituto Nacional de Estadística de Uruguay

Places of worship
 Parish Church of St. Joseph the Worker (Roman Catholic)

References

External links

INE map of Montes

Populated places in the Canelones Department